Ali Magomedovich Aliyev (born June 2, 1983) is a Russian amateur boxer who won a gold medal at the 
2006 European Championships in 2006 and silver at the 2006 World Cup.

References

External links 

Living people
1983 births
Sportspeople from Makhachkala
Russian male boxers
Bantamweight boxers